"When I'm Cleaning Windows" is a comedy song performed by Lancastrian comic, actor and ukulele player George Formby. It first appeared in the 1936 film Keep Your Seats, Please. The song was credited as written by Formby, Harry Gifford and Fred E. Cliffe. Formby performed the song in A♭ in Keep Your Seats, Please. For the single release, the key was changed to B♭.

The song was so successful that George Formby recorded another version of the song entitled "The Window Cleaner (No. 2)".  This song uses similar orchestration to the original version and it is about further things which were seen on a window cleaning round.

Because the song’s lyrics were racy for the time, it was banned by the BBC from being played on the radio. The corporation's director general John Reith stated that "if the public wants to listen to Formby singing his disgusting little ditty, they'll have to be content to hear it in the cinemas, not over the nation's airwaves"; Formby and his wife and manager Beryl Ingham were furious with the block on the song. In May 1941, Ingham informed the BBC that the song was a favourite of the royal family, particularly Queen Mary, while a statement by Formby pointed out that "I sang it before the King and Queen at the Royal Variety Performance". The BBC relented and started to broadcast the song.

The record's sales were so successful that Regal Zonophone awarded Formby the first silver disc for sales of over 100,000 copies.

A dance mix of the song, sampling the first eight lines of Formby's original vocals from the first version, appeared in the UK Singles Chart in December 1994 by 2 in a Tent, who were Amadeus Mozart and Andy Pickles (Jive Bunny/Hyperlogic). The video for this release featured Mozart, Pickles and Stars in Their Eyes finalist David Clarke as George Formby.

The song is played in the 2003 PlayStation 2 game EyeToy: Play during the window washing mini-game.

References

Songs about occupations
1936 songs
Comedy songs
Novelty songs
George Formby songs
Songs banned by the BBC
Songs written by George Formby
Songs written by Fred E. Cliffe
Songs written by Harry Gifford (songwriter)